Cyperus sphaerospermus is a species of sedge that is native to southern parts of Africa.

See also 
 List of Cyperus species

References 

sphaerospermus
Plants described in 1832
Flora of South Africa
Flora of Zimbabwe
Flora of Namibia
Flora of Botswana
Flora of Mozambique
Flora of Zambia
Taxa named by Heinrich Schrader